Baatarsükhiin Chinzorig (born 21 September 1991) is a Mongolian amateur boxer. He competes in the light welterweight division in international tournaments. Chinzorig has won medals in the Asian Games and Asian Boxing Champions, winning won gold in the 2021 Asian Amateur Boxing Championships. Chinzorig competed in the light welterweight event at the 2016 Summer Olympics, but was eliminated in the second bout.

References

External links

 

1991 births
Living people
Mongolian male boxers
Olympic boxers of Mongolia
Boxers at the 2016 Summer Olympics
Place of birth missing (living people)
Asian Games medalists in boxing
Boxers at the 2018 Asian Games
Asian Games silver medalists for Mongolia
Medalists at the 2018 Asian Games
Boxers at the 2014 Asian Games
Light-welterweight boxers
Sportspeople from Ulaanbaatar
Boxers at the 2020 Summer Olympics
21st-century Mongolian people